Avery Farmhouse is a historic home and farm complex located at Duanesburg in Schenectady County, New York. The house was built about 1850 by noted master carpenter Alexander Delos "Boss" Jones.  It is a two-story, "T" shaped, clapboard sided frame building in the Greek Revival style. The main block is flanked by two one story frame wings. It features a giant pedimented portico supported by square columns. Contributing outbuildings include five silos, a garage, a large multi-component barn complex, and a barn.

The property was listed on the National Register of Historic Places in 1984.

References

Houses completed in 1850
Houses on the National Register of Historic Places in New York (state)
Houses in Schenectady County, New York
Greek Revival houses in New York (state)
National Register of Historic Places in Schenectady County, New York